Coya Elliott is an American sound editor. She was nominated for an Academy Award in the category Best Sound for the film Soul.

Selected filmography 
 Soul (2020; co-nominated with Ren Klyce and David Parker)

References

External links 

Living people
Place of birth missing (living people)
Year of birth missing (living people)
American sound editors